Robert C. Marshall (September 18, 1888 – ?) was an American football and basketball coach and college athletics administrator. He served as the head football coach at the University of Richmond in 1918, Randolph–Macon College in 1919, and Howard College—now known as Samford University—in 1920 and 1921, compiling a career college football record of 10–19–2. Marshall was also the head basketball coach at Richmond for one season, in 1918–19, and at Howard for two seasons, from 1920 to 1922, compiling a career college basketball record of 7–19.

Marshall was born on September 18, 1888. He earned a Bachelor of Science from Howard College and a Master of Education from Syracuse University. Marshall was appointed athletic director at Howard College in August 1920.

Head coaching record

Football

College basketball

References

1888 births
Year of death missing
Randolph–Macon Yellow Jackets athletic directors
Randolph–Macon Yellow Jackets football coaches
Richmond Spiders athletic directors
Richmond Spiders football coaches
Richmond Spiders men's basketball coaches
Samford Bulldogs athletic directors
Samford Bulldogs football coaches
Samford Bulldogs men's basketball coaches
Samford University alumni
Syracuse University alumni